The South Carolina Institute of Archaeology and Anthropology, or SCIAA, was founded in 1963 as a research institute at University of South Carolina and as a State cultural resource management agency. In the latter capacity, SCIAA is part of the Executive Department of the South Carolina State Government and serves as the main State agency concerned with the State's Archaeology (both prehistoric and historic), and its discovery, study, interpretation, publication, and official conservation at its curatorial facilities. As a University research institute, SCIAA both initiates and conducts a wide spectrum of field investigations and collections research throughout South Carolina. SCIAA participates in numerous university projects, and is a significant part of the University's infrastructure, and the University's publication series.

History 
In 1968, laws were passed to help control salvage that included the Hobby Diver License and under the authority of SCIAA Director Dr. Robert L. Stephenson.

References

External links 
 

1963 establishments in South Carolina
Anthropological research institutes
Archaeological research institutes
Organizations established in 1963
Research institutes in South Carolina
University of South Carolina